Rona Gurkewitz is an American mathematician and computer scientist, known for her work on modular origami. She is a professor emerita of computer science at Western Connecticut State University, and the former head of the department of computer science there.

Origami
Gurkewitz became interested in origami after meeting origami pioneer Lillian Oppenheimer at a dinner party and becoming a regular visitor to Oppenheimer's origami get-togethers. She has written several books on origami, exhibited works at international origami shows, supplied a piece for the set design of the premiere of the Rajiv Joseph play Animals Out of Paper, and has made modular origami quilts as well as polyhedra.

Books
With retired mechanical engineer Bennett Arnstein, Gurkewitz is the coauthor of books including:
3D Geometric Origami: Modular Origami Polyhedra (Dover, 1996)
Multimodular Origami Polyhedra: Archimedeans, Buckyballs and Duality (Dover, 2002)
Beginner's Book of Modular Origami Polyhedra: The Platonic Solids (Dover, 2008)
With Arnstein and Lewis Simon, she is a coauthor of the second edition of the book Modular Origami Polyhedra (Dover, 1999), extended from the first edition by Arnstein and Simon.

References

External links
Rona Gurkewitz' Modular Origami Polyhedra Systems Page

Year of birth missing (living people)
Living people
20th-century American mathematicians
American computer scientists
American women mathematicians
American women computer scientists
Western Connecticut State University faculty
Origami artists
20th-century American women
21st-century American women